Plum Run  is a Pennsylvania stream and tributary of White Run which flows through East Cavalry Field of the Gettysburg National Military Park.  The run forms a man-made lake above the Lake Heritage dam near the run's mouth along the Baltimore Pike.

References

Rivers of Adams County, Pennsylvania
Gettysburg Battlefield
Tributaries of the Monocacy River
Rivers of Pennsylvania